Lauren Shakely is a poet, columnist, and publisher.

Personal life
Lauren Shakely is the grand-daughter of US Court of Appeals 11th Cir. judge Warren Leroy Jones (died 1993).

Career
Shakely has worked in senior editorial roles at Aperture, ARTnews, the Metropolitan Museum of Art, and Rizzoli.  Shakely joined Clarkson Potter around 1988, and by 2009, Shakely was publisher and senior vice president.

Works

References

20th-century American poets
20th-century American women writers
21st-century American women
American book publishers (people)
American women poets
Living people
Year of birth missing (living people)